Nanzhou Station can refer to:
Nanzhou railway station, a railway station in Pingtung, Taiwan
Nanzhou station (Guangzhou Metro), a station on the Guangzhou and Guangfo Metro